{|
{{Infobox ship image
| Ship image               = 
| Ship caption             = HMS Belvoir, 29 May 1945 (IWM)
}}

|}

HMS Belvoir was a  destroyer of the Royal Navy. She was a member of the third subgroup of the class, and saw service in the Second World War. She was adopted by the civil community of Sutton in Ashfield, Nottinghamshire during Warship Week in 1942.

Service history
On commissioning Belvoir'' was deployed to Scapa Flow for service with the Home Fleet. She was subsequently allocated to the 2nd Destroyer Flotilla and escorted convoys to South Africa, then transferred to the Mediterranean, including service escorting Malta Convoys. In 1943 she took part in escort duties as part of Operation Husky, the allied landings in Sicily and subsequently the landings at Salerno.

In 1944 she was prepared for service as part of the Allied landings in the south of France and subsequently in the Adriatic. In June 1945 she returned to the UK for paying off.

In 1946 she was reduced to reserve status and laid up at Portsmouth. She was placed on the disposal list in 1957 and sold. She was scrapped by McLennan, arriving at their yard at Bo'Ness on 21 October 1957.

References

Publications
 
 

 

Hunt-class destroyers of the Royal Navy
Ships built on the River Mersey
1941 ships
World War II destroyers of the United Kingdom